Est en Opijnen is a former municipality in the Dutch province of Gelderland. It existed until 1978, when it was merged with Neerijnen. Before 1818, the municipality was called "Opijnen.

The municipality covered the villages of Est and Opijnen.

References

Former municipalities of Gelderland
West Betuwe